KTMB (102.1 FM, "Classic Hits 102.1") is a commercial radio station licensed in Anchorage, Alaska, United States. The station is owned by Ohana Media and broadcasts a classic hits format. KTMB's studios are located in Downtown Anchorage and its transmitter is in the city's Bayshore district. It is unique among Anchorage radio stations in that it has no live disc jockeys and guarantees to tell listeners the name and artist of every song played.

History
The station first signed on November 6, 1961, as KBYR-FM. The station went silent for a time after the 1964 Alaska earthquake; it became KAMU in 1966 and KWKO in 1969. From 1967 to 1973, KAMU/KWKO broadcast an easy listening format. During this period, the station's main program was Night Flight. As Anchorage was a major stopover point for various airlines' intercontinental routes, the show featured a unique opening simulating a jet in takeoff mode. Station owner Joe O'Hearn welcomed listeners as the "captain" of the program, and flight attendants representing various international airlines recited safety procedures in their native languages as well as in English.

The station changed its call sign to KJZZ in 1973, then to KRKN in 1986. From 1986 to 1994, the station held the call letters KPXR. In March 1994, the station became KKRO, broadcasting classic rock as "Arrow" until 2002. In 1997, Ingstad AK Broadcasting, Inc. sold KKRO to Williams Broadcasting, Inc. for $850,000.

On September 7, 2011, at 12:01 a.m., the then-KDBZ changed its format from hot adult contemporary (branded as "102.1 The Buzz") to adult album alternative (AAA), branded as "102.1 The Peak".

On March 7, 2014 KDBZ flipped to classic hits and rebranded as "Oldies 102.1". The station also changed its call sign to KTMB.

References

External links

1961 establishments in Alaska
Ohana Broadcast Company, LLC stations
Classic hits radio stations in the United States
Radio stations established in 1961
TMB